Flor Elena González (born February 2, 1960 in Venezuela) is a Venezuelan actress who appears in telenovelas.

Personal
Her first name means "flower" in Spanish. She has a daughter called Minerva and granddaughter Tábata.

Filmography
Aurora Short Film  — Aurora
Corazón Esmeralda — Isabel Cordero de Montalvo
Dulce Amargo
Natalia del Mar — Eleonora de Moncada
Los misterios del amor — Diana 
Valeria — Piedad Riquelme
Aunque mal paguen  
Los Querendones — Esther 
Mujer con pantalones — Candelaria de Lisboa 
La cuaima — Pepita Hamilton de Alvarenga 
Juana la virgen - Amparo de Vivas 
La soberana — Dulce de Mesías 
Mis 3 hermanas — Delia 
Hay Amores Que Matan — Elpidia 
Hoy te Vi — Eva Gómez de Pereira 
Cambio de piel  - Perla Garcia
Amores de Fin de Siglo
Antes de morir 
Por Estas Calles — Maigualida Cazado

References 

Venezuelan television actresses
Venezuelan telenovela actresses
Living people
1960 births